Loham: The Yellow Metal is a 2015 Indian Malayalam-language action thriller film written and directed by Ranjith, and produced by Antony Perumbavoor for the production company Aashirvad Cinemas. Sreevalsan J. Menon and C. Rajamani composed the soundtrack and film score, respectively.

Loham opened on 20 August 2015 in over 250 theatres across India. Its release in the United Arab Emirates and the United Kingdom followed on 28 August. The film was a commercial success at the box office, upon release, it set a record for the highest opening day gross for a Malayalam film at the time. Loham received mixed reactions from critics, some of whom praised the lead actors' performances and the film's technical aspects but criticised the screenplay.

Plot 
A casket containing the body of a deceased construction worker, Rafeeq, is flown from Dubai to the Calicut International Airport in Kozhikode, then transported by ambulance to its destination. When they open the casket, they discover the gold is missing.

Around the same time, Jayanthi arrives in Kochi from Mumbai in search of her missing husband, Ramesh, an IRS officer who frequently disappeared from home for various reasons, but is now a suspect in the gold smuggling. Jayanthi arranged for a taxi to drive her to various locations in her quest to find Ramesh. Raju, the cab driver appears to have an interest of his own in the circumstances surrounding Ramesh's disappearance. At Jayanthi's bidding, Raju drives her to the home of her mother-in-law, where he cooks for them and interacts in such a way to earn their trust.

Jayanthi then asks Raju to drive her to Kochi to the office of her friend, ACP Chandrasekharan, who promises Jayanthi he will investigate the disappearance of Ramesh. After leaving Chandrasekharan's office, Raju drives Jayanthi to see Chandrasekharan's wife, Adv. Rekha, who is also her friend. During their chat, Jayanthi receives a surprise phone call from Ramesh. He explains that he is in Kovalam for an official meeting but will return home the next day, and insists that Jayanthi return home as well.

Later, Chandrasekharan informs Jayanthi that the phone number Ramesh called from was actually in Kochi, not Kovalam. It is also revealed that Sudheer, Ramesh's brother, is involved in the smuggling operation. Meanwhile, Unni, Babu, Shaji, Shenoy, and MLA meet atop an apartment building to discuss the circumstances surrounding the gold they smuggled into Kozhikode and lost to an ambush while in transit from the airport. They suspect Ramesh is involved since he disappeared right after the incident. They devise a plan to kidnap Jayanthi in order to force Ramesh to return the gold.

An unsuspecting Raju and Jayanthi become the targets of their surprise attack in which Jayanthi is rendered unconscious. Raju draws his concealed handgun and foils the kidnapping by shooting at his assailants. He collects the unconscious Jayanthi and transports her to a safe place. When she awakens, she finds herself surrounded by strangers. She also discovers that Raju is not just a cab driver, but is part of an investigation to find Ramesh and the missing gold. Raju explains to her that Ramesh was involved in the smuggling, and has since become the target of the criminals.

Jayanthi returns to Rekha's home for safety, and Chandrasekharan begins investigating Raju, who, in a turn of events, has raised suspicion. Raju and his team, now disguised as Sabarimala pilgrims, rent a van hoping to catch Jayan. Raju's teammate, Ameer Amanulla, pretends to be an informer for Arif Bhai. He lures Jayan into a trap by telling him a gift from Arif is waiting for him in the van. Jayan is captured and interrogated by Raju, who questions the 30,000 Dirham Jayan received from Arif in Dubai, as well as the circumstances surrounding the death of Rafeeq.

Jayan reveals that Rafeeq was purposely pushed off a building to his death as part of Arif's master plan to transport the gold, thinking no one would suspect the gold was hidden in his casket. The trail leads Raju to the home of Ramesh's parents, where Ramesh has been hiding under the protection of his mother, who is also aware of the smuggling. Raju takes Ramesh into custody along with others involved in the crime, but he lets Ramesh go. It is eventually revealed that co-smuggler Shaji, a young politician, had deceived Unni and took the gold for himself.

After Raju and his team retrieve the gold, they are detained by local police. Raju identifies himself as a RAW agent and his team as intelligence officers from various agencies of India. He discloses his real name as Rajeev Sathyamoorthy. The police release them so that they can complete their investigation and allows them to go back to Mumbai. However, it is revealed that Raju and his team are the actual smugglers.

Cast 

Principal cast
 Mohanlal as Rajeev "Raju" Sathyamoorthy
 Renji Panicker as Albert Alex
 Siddique as Muhammed Unni
 Andrea Jeremiah as Jayanthi Ramesh
 Abu Salim as Ameer Amanullah
 Gowri Nandha as Jacqueline Fernandez
 Vijayaraghavan as ACP M. Chandrasekharan
 Lohan Balan as Babu, Mohammed Unni's assistant
 Niranjana Anoop as Mythri
 K. P. A. C. Lalitha as Ramesh and Sudheer's mother
 Ashvin Mathew as Ramesh Nambiar IRS, Custom's officer
 Ajmal Ameer as Azhagan Perumal
 Hareesh Peradi as MLA
 Suresh Krishna as Shaji Bhaskar
 Krishna as Jayaram Shenoy
 Joju George as Pallan Davis
 Mohan Jose as Kunjumon
 Muthumani as Advocate Rekha Chandrasekhar, Mythri's mother
 Santhosh Keezhattoor as Sudheer, Ramesh's brother
 Irshad as Jayan
 Musthafa as Rafeeq Muhammed
 Mythili as Rafeeq's wife
 Aju Varghese as auto driver
 Sadiq
 Jayan Cherthala as Commissioner Varghese IPS
 Sundarapandiyan as Sub Inspector

Cameos
 Joy Mathew as Arif Bhai
 Shyamaprasad as Rajeev Sathyamoorthy in, RAW officer
 Pearle Maaney as the bride
 Manikuttan as a boy at the wedding
 Srinda Arhaan as a girl at the wedding
 Thesni Khan as a nurse
 Tini Tom as Jacob alias Thrissurkaran Thendi
 Soubin Shahir as Street Rowdy
 Rajesh Sharma
 Sasi Kalinga as the stranger near Jayan's home
 Pradeep Chandran as SI Biju
 Sajan Palluruthy as Security Guard
 Thomas Kuriakose
 Deepak Parambol

Production

Development 

In 2013, Ranjith announced plans to produce a film for Aashirvad Cinemas, starring Mohanlal and Manju Warrier, which was scheduled for a 2014 release coinciding with the annual Vishu festival held in Kerala, India. Production was slated to begin in December 2013. The announcement of Loham received considerable media attention as it was Manju Warrier's return to the screen after leaving the film industry to marry actor Dileep. The media coverage was further heightened when Prithviraj Sukumaran joined the cast. However, the film was shelved soon after its official announcement. Ranjith explained it was dropped because the film's story resembled that of another film in the same language released during its pre-production time. It was Prithviraj who noticed that the ending sequence of the planned script was similar to that of Thira (2013).

Later that year, the director planned another film with the same production company starring Mohanlal, which was titled G for Gold. Filming was scheduled to begin on 10 January 2014 in Kozhikode and Kasargode, but production did not begin on schedule due to Ranjith's dissatisfaction with the screenplay. He revised the screenplay and re-titled the film as Loham. Loham was announced in February 2015.

Casting and crew 

Loham is the fifth film directed by Ranjith in which Mohanlal was cast in the lead role. Ajmal Ameer and Andrea Jeremiah were confirmed during the pre-production period. Gauri Nanda received boxing lessons to help her prepare for her role. Niranjana Anoop, a daughter of one of Ranjith's family friends, made her acting debut in the film as Mythri, a badly behaved youngster. Loham is the second collaboration between Ameer and Mohanlal, following Madampi (2008). Ajmal's character's looks were modelled after popular young politicians in the country, who are often spotted in the white kurta-jacket outfit. In March 2015, it was confirmed that Aju Varghese would play a guest role. Also Deepak Parambol who came to see Mohanlal in the filming location ended up in a guest role. In April, Srinda Ashab, Manikuttan and Parvathi Menon were also signed for guest appearances in a musical performance. The Hindu wedding song was shot in Kozhikode. Several media outlets reported Pearle Maaney was to perform an item number in the film but the report was determined to be incorrect after a selfie of Maaney dressed in a wedding outfit was leaked online. She appeared in a cameo role. Maaney's scenes were filmed in three days. Salim grew a beard and shaved his head for his role. He said, "My getup in the movie is similar to that of Dwayne Johnson".

Kunjunni S. Kumar, son of cinematographer S. Kumar, was hired as Loham's cinematographer. Kunjunni had first worked with Ranjith as an associate director during the production of Indian Rupee (2011) while his father worked behind the camera. Earlier, he was supposed to debut as a cinematographer on Ranjith's Leela in 2012, but the project was shelved ten days before production. In an interview with the Deccan Chronicle, Kunjunni said that after the script narration, Ranjith told him to avoid gimmicks in framing and shots in order to make it more realistic. Mythili, who was cast by Ranjith in her debut film, acted in and served as an assistant director for the film which was her debut behind the camera. She also sang a duet song in the film's soundtrack. Sreevalsan J. Menon was selected by Ranjith to compose the film's original music score. Renji Panicker suggested Menon to Ranjith during the film's pre-production stage. C. Rajamani composed the film score.

Filming and promotions 
Principal photography began on 8 March 2015, at the Calicut International Airport in Kozhikode. M. D. Sasidharan, managing director of Gold Coin Motion Pictures, performed the switch-on, and K. R. Pramod, chief manager of Mathrubhumi, made the first clap. The film was shot in various locations including Kozhikode, Kochi, Delhi and Dubai.Production moved to Kochi after the shoot in Calicut. Willingdon Island and Fort Kochi were some of the shooting locations on the Kochi schedule. Filming wrapped in May 2015. Loham'''s production budget was estimated to be .

On 18 March 2015, the first image capture from the film was released, featuring Andrea, Ranjith and Mohanlal on location in Calicut. The first-look poster featuring Mohanlal was released on 29 June 2015. More detailed posters were released during the first week of August. The first poster showed an ensemble cast with Mohanlal in the centre; their facial expressions indicative of the film's thriller genre. Other posters showed Mohanlal wearing army-style camouflage pants.

The first teaser of the film was 44 seconds long and was released on 12 August 2015. It received positive reviews in various media outlets with regard to Mohanlal's acting, and for the film's plot as a thriller. The teaser received over 200,000 views within 24 hours on YouTube, and over 400,000 views within three days. An official trailer 1.37 minutes long was released on 18 August 2015.

 Soundtrack 

The film's music was composed by Sreevalsan J. Menon, and lyrics were written by Rafeeq Ahammed, Manoj Kuroor and Rajeev Nair. The first song, "Kanaka Mayilanchi", sung by Mythili, was released by Mathrubhumi on 13 August 2015. Mythili also sang a duet with Shahabaz Aman. The Times of India called it "a melody that remind [sic] listeners of the golden era of Malayalam cinema". The audio CD comprising three songs was released on 17 August during a function held at Kochi.

 Release Loham was initially scheduled to be released in July 2015 during Ramadan, but it had to be postponed until 20 August because of delays in post-production. The film was then scheduled to open in India on 20 August 2015 as a festival release during the Onam season.

The film was distributed to 250 theatres across India, resulting in approximately 1000 screenings daily. On 20 August 2015, the film was released on 141 screens in Kerala, and to other theatres in India on 21 August 2015. The film's debut in the Middle East took place on 27 August 2015. It also opened in theatres in the UAE and UK on 28 August 2015. Rights for television broadcast was sold as a joint venture to Asianet and Kairali TV for 6 crore and 1 crore respectively. The film was released on DVD in India by Central Home Entertainment on 2 December 2015.

 Box office 
Loham created a new opening day record in Malayalam that surpassed the previous record set by Casanovva in 2012. It collected  in its first weekend (4 days) from the state. Special screenings were arranged by some of the major releasing centres of Kerala. By the end of the first weekend, distribution of the film was increased to include more cities. The film collected  from Kerala in its final run, generating  in box office revenue worldwide.

 Critical reception Loham received mixed reviews from critics. Rejath R.G of Kerala Kaumudi said, "Renjith has beautifully conceived the film", and praised the technical aspects with special mention to Kunjunni's camera work and the three "beautiful" songs composed by Sreevalsan. He summarised it as "a watchable good film that could have been much better if the director paid a little more attention to the screenplay. The problem is that it loses steam here and there, particularly in the post-interval sequences". Deccan Chronicle rated the film 2.5 out of 5 and said, "Any of [Mohanlal's] fans, who are exposed to thrillers of Hollywood and Bollywood like Ocean's 11 and Special 26 will lose the thrill soon. There is nothing commendable about the script or cinematography or music", but he praised Mohanlal's action sequences and car chasing scenes, Siddique and his companion's performances, and Mythili and Musthafa's "heart touching" moments. He called the message of the film "socially relevant" and "effective". Akhila Menon of Filmibeat also gave the film 2.5 out of 5 stars. She praised the performances of Mohanlal and Siddique, but was less enthusiastic about the script, observing that "Ranjith's craft as a filmmaker is visible throughout the movie. But what Loham lacks is his brilliance as a writer".

Pramod Thomas of The New Indian Express commented, "Mollywood has been in an experimental mode of late. Unfortunately, movies like Loham are many laps behind. . . . When Megalomaniac directors decide to live in the shadow of their past glory, films like Loham happen".  Parech C. Palicha of Rediff.com commented, "Loham lacks lustre, and is not original at all". Sify praised the performance of Mohanlal and the humour of Siddique and Soubin Saheer but criticised the script, saying, "Loham is about a topical subject, but it is far from engaging". Raj Vikram of Metromatinee said that technically the film is slick with well shot sequences. "Mohanlal is the lifeblood of the movie, and he pulls off an easy role by his standards with characteristic panache . . . Loham'' is not among the best works of director Renjith but is far better than some of his forgettable duds."

References

External links 
 
 

2010s Malayalam-language films
2015 action thriller films
2015 films
Films scored by Sreevalsan J. Menon
Films directed by Ranjith
Films shot in Kozhikode
Indian action thriller films
Aashirvad Cinemas films
Films shot in Kochi